Walt Whitman Shops (formerly known as Walt Whitman Mall) is a shopping mall in Huntington Station, New York in Suffolk County, New York on Long Island. As of 2022, the mall currently features Bloomingdale's, Macy's, and Saks Fifth Avenue. The mall currently features notable brands Lululemon, Brooks Brothers, Louis Vuitton, Vineyard Vines, Kate Spade New York, and Madewell

The mall is owned and managed by Simon Property Group, one of the largest developers of shopping malls in the US.

The mall is named for the poet Walt Whitman due to the close proximity to his birthplace, a US National Historic Site, located near the mall.

Incidents
November 13, 1984: A fire destroyed seven stores and damaged 25 others in the 76-store mall.
May 16, 1991: In 1993, a McCrory's worker pleaded guilty to tossing a lit cigarette into a display of silk flowers set on a block of styrofoam, causing significant damage to the store and killing two of his coworkers aged 20 and 27.
February 22, 2014: A carbon monoxide leak in a restaurant complex consisting of Legal Sea Foods, The Cheesecake Factory, and Panera Bread attached to the mall killed one person and sickened 28 others. All three restaurants were evacuated.

Anchors
Bloomingdale's (225,000 square feet, 2 floors above ground, 1 floor below ground) Opened in 1962 as Macy's. Closed for renovation in 1998 and reopened as a Bloomingdale's. Macy's had opened in 1995 in the much larger spot vacated by Abraham & Straus that same year. This resulted in two Macy's stores at the same mall for over two years.

Macy's (315,000 square feet, 3 floors above ground, 1 floor below ground) Opened in 1962 as Abraham & Straus, which was then closed and converted to Macy's in 1995.

Saks Fifth Avenue (100,000 square feet, 2 floors above ground) Opened in 1999 in mall expansion replacing the former McCrory Store which had closed in 1991 after being destroyed in a fire. This location is the only branch location in the state of New York, save for the flagship store in Midtown Manhattan, New York City.

Previous anchors
Abraham & Straus 
Macy's (original store)
McCrory Stores
Lord & Taylor

References

External links
 
 Labelscar Retail History Blog

Simon Property Group
Shopping malls in New York (state)
Huntington, New York
Buildings and structures in Suffolk County, New York
Tourist attractions in Suffolk County, New York
Shopping malls in the New York metropolitan area
Shopping malls established in 1962
1962 establishments in New York (state)